Yelan-Chishma (Yalan-Şişmä) is a rural locality (a selo) in Sukkulovsky Selsoviet, Yermekeyevsky District, Bashkortostan, Russia. The population was 438 as of 2010. There are 12 streets.

Geography 
Yelan-Chishma is located 17 km northeast of Yermekeyevo (the district's administrative centre) by road. Kalinovka is the nearest rural locality.

References 

Rural localities in Yermekeyevsky District